Martin Austin Ruane (10 October 1946 – 29 November 1998) was an English professional wrestler of Irish parentage, best known by the ring name Giant Haystacks. He was one of the best-known wrestlers on the British wrestling scene in the 1970s and 1980s. He also worked in both Canada and the United States under the name Loch Ness Monster or simply Loch Ness.

In the 1970s he formed a heel (those that portray the villains) team with Big Daddy and later had a long-running, high drawing feud with a face Big Daddy as the team broke up. During his career, he held the European Heavyweight Championship and British Heavyweight Championship in the UK, and won the Stampede International Tag Team Championship in Canada, with the Dynamite Kid.

Early life
Ruane was born in Camberwell, London, on 10 October 1946. He weighed 14 lbs and 6 oz at birth. His father was from Ballyhaunis, County Mayo, Ireland. In 1949, when he was three years old, Ruane and his family moved from London to Broughton in Salford, Lancashire, which remained his home. He attended St. Thomas' School until he left aged 14. He worked as a scraper driver building motorways, and as a nightclub bouncer before a friend suggested he take up wrestling.

Professional wrestling career
Ruane began wrestling in 1967, initially for the independent WFGB as Luke McMasters (later incorrectly reported as being his legal name). In the early 1970s, Ruane worked for Wrestling Enterprises (of Birkenhead), where he was billed as Haystacks Calhoun, after the American wrestling star William Calhoun who had wrestled under that name in NWA: All-Star Wrestling and the World Wide Wrestling Federation. Ruane's name was subsequently modified to Giant Haystacks.

In summer 1975, he moved to Joint Promotions, where he formed a heel tag team with Big Daddy (also a heel at this point). Haystacks' TV debut came in July that year, when he and Daddy teamed up against the brothers Roy and Tony St. Clair, losing by disqualification. Although mainly known as brutal superheavyweight heels who crushed blue-eye opponents, they also had a major feud with masked fellow heel Kendo Nagasaki.

Daddy in particular heard cheers during this feud and eventually completed a turn to blue eye. This was cemented when Haystacks and Daddy broke up their tag team in 1977 and feuded with each other, with Haystacks remaining as the heel, resulting in high ratings on Britain's ITV Saturday sports show World of Sport any time they battled one another and establishing Haystacks as a household name during the 1970s and 1980s. The feud began on television when the two reached the finals of a four-man knockout tournament only for Haystacks to walk out in the opening seconds of the final match. It would continue on and off until Daddy's retirement in 1993.

Haystacks also wrestled all over the world. Ruane wrestled in Calgary, Alberta, Canada for Stu Hart's Stampede Wrestling promotion as the Loch Ness Monster, managed by J.R. Foley from Wigan, England (alias John Foley, alumnus of Billy Riley's Wigan Snakepit wrestling school). He also worked for the CWA in Germany and Austria, winning several trophy tournaments there, including in India and Zimbabwe, where he was made an honorary citizen.

In January 1996, after spending time as a debt-collector in Manchester, selling cars, and undergoing knee surgery, Ruane debuted in the United States for World Championship Wrestling, under the ring name Loch Ness. His only pay-per-view appearance was a loss to The Giant at Uncensored. He served as a member of The Dungeon of Doom who were at that time, feuding with Hulk Hogan. However, the feud was short-lived, ending abruptly when Ruane contracted lymphoma and returned to Britain. His last match was against The Giant at WCW Uncensored 1996, where he would lose in a short match.

Personal life 
Ruane, a private person, was a devout Catholic and refused to wrestle on Sundays. He ate three pounds of bacon and a dozen eggs every morning to maintain his strength. Ruane married his childhood sweetheart Rita Boylan at the age of 17 in 1965. They had three sons, Martin, Stephen, and Noel. All of them worked in construction.

Death
On 29 November 1998, Ruane died of lymphoma at his home in Prestwich near Manchester. He was 52, and was survived by his wife Rita and three sons.

Other media
Ruane appeared in the films Quest for Fire (1981) and Give My Regards to Broad Street (1984); the latter was written by Paul McCartney, who was a fan of Ruane, and both were later lifelong friends. Roy Jenkins, Queen Elizabeth, and Frank Sinatra were also fans of Ruane.

In 1990, he also appeared on S4C in an episode of the Welsh language soap opera Pobol y Cwm, as himself when he came to the valley for a wrestling match with El Bandito (Orig Williams).

Ruane released a single titled "Baby I Need You" in 1983.

A play by Brian Mitchell and Joseph Nixon, Big Daddy vs Giant Haystacks, was performed at the Brighton Festival Fringe between 26 and 28 May 2011.

Manic Street Preachers mention Giant Haystacks in their song Me and Stephen Hawking from their ninth studio album Journal for Plague Lovers (2009).

In late 2021 a Giant Haystacks Retro figure was release by Chella Toys. There was a blue and brown variant for 2022 release.

In February 2022 writer Rob Cope released a memoir Giant Haystacks: My Heavyweight Hero via online publisher lulu.com detailing his meetings with Haystacks, then in the last months of his life and the story the wrestler had told him of his life and career. The book was released to raise funds for the Christie Cancer Hospital in Manchester.

Championships and accomplishments
 British Wrestling Federation
 BWF European Heavyweight Championship (1 time)
 Joint Promotions
 Joint Promotions British Heavyweight Championship (1 time)
 Stampede Wrestling
 Stampede International Tag Team Championship (1 time) – with Dynamite Kid
Wrestling Observer Newsletter
Worst Wrestler (1996)

References

External links
 

1946 births
1998 deaths
20th-century professional wrestlers
Deaths from cancer in England
English male professional wrestlers
English people of Irish descent
People from Camberwell
People from Swinton, Greater Manchester
Stampede Wrestling alumni
Stampede Wrestling International Tag Team Champions